Khatib Abdalla Mwashetani is a Kenyan politician. He represents Lungalunga constituency in the Kenyan National Assembly, the lower house of the Parliament. He was first elected in the March 4th 2013 Kenyan General Elections. He was elected on a Forum for Restoration of Democracy-Kenya (FORD-Kenya) ticket. His constituency is located in the South Coast and borders Tanzania to the south.

References

Living people
Members of the National Assembly (Kenya)
Year of birth missing (living people)